Jonathan Wood is a British hedge fund manager and donor to the UK Conservative Party. He is the founder of the hedge fund SRM Global. He donated £500,000 to the Conservative Party in 2010.

Wood was born in Yorkshire and grew up in Whitstable, Kent, the middle of three children. He studied economics at Loughborough University. He was a successful trader at UBS, reportedly earning $2.4 billion for the bank over a six-year period.

He was an investor in The Gadget Shop and, after the firm went into administration, he later filed a lawsuit for £100 million against former partners Tom Hunter and Chris Gorman. He alleged Gorman and Hunter had privately acquired Birthdays, ruining a potentially lucrative merger between the retailer and the Gadget Shop. The lawsuit which cost £100 million was dismissed: Gorman and Hunter had made a loss on their acquisition and the judge described Wood as "evasive" and "a very hard and calculating man". 
According to The Times, it was following this lawsuit that he was nicknamed Keyser Söze after the "crime lord" in The Usual Suspects film – a nickname he doesn't like.

According to The Wall Street Journal, Wood set up SRM Global Fund in September 2006 raising about $3 billion but by July 2008 the value had fallen by 85%. It was a major investor in Northern Rock which was bailed out by the UK taxpayer in September 2007 and nationalized in February 2008. Investors were not allowed to withdraw money. SRM is registered in the Cayman Islands, with offices in Monaco.
Wood blamed the British and American governments for the Financial crisis of 2007–08 saying that Lehman Brothers and Northern Rock should not have been stopped from trading.

References 

Year of birth missing (living people)
Living people